Saint-Dizier-Leyrenne is a former commune in the Creuse department in central France. On 1 January 2019, it was merged into the new commune Saint-Dizier-Masbaraud.

Population

See also
Communes of the Creuse department

References

Former communes of Creuse
Populated places disestablished in 2019